Talassemtane National Park is a national park in the Rif region of Northern Morocco. The  park was created in October 2004 to conserve the last of Morocco's threatened fir forests.

Talassemtane is part of the Transcontinental Biosphere Reserve of the Mediterranean.

The park's proximity to the popular tourist destination, Chefchaouen makes it a common hiking destination. The park's elevation ranges from 350 meters to 1,050 meters.

It is a very original territory characterized by unique biodiversity and landscapes.

Popular hiking destinations include the Bridge of God, a natural bridge formation, and the villages of El Kalaá and Akchour.

Wildlife

Flora 
The park is situated within the Spanish/Maghrebi biodiversity hotspot. Over 1380 plant species have been recorded, 47 of which are endemic to Morocco. The only Spanish firs native to Morocco  can be found in the heart of the park, under the highest level of protection. Other species that live in the park include the endangered Atlas cedar and Andalusian Belladonna.

Fauna 
The Bearded vulture and over 100 other birds have been observed at the park.

World Heritage Status
This site was added to the UNESCO World Heritage Tentative List on 12/10/1998 in the natural category.

References

National parks of Morocco
Protected areas established in 2004
Rif
Geography of Tanger-Tetouan-Al Hoceima